Death Weekend (released in the USA under the title The House by the Lake) is a 1976 Canadian horror/thriller film. It stars Brenda Vaccaro and Don Stroud and was one of the first films from Canadian director William Fruet. The low-budget production was shot in rural Canada and at a studio in Kleinburg, Ontario, Canada.

In 2019, the film got a Blu-ray release from Germany. The VHS was seized and confiscated in the UK under Section 3 of the Obscene Publications Act 1959 during the video nasty panic.

Plot
The film is set over a period of 24 hours on a cold November day in rural Ontario. Diane (Brenda Vaccaro), a former fashion model, meets Harry (Chuck Shamata), a wealthy dentist swinger. After a whirlwind romance, she decides to accompany Harry for a weekend party at his remote country house by a lake. On their way in Harry's Corvette, Diane asks Harry to let her drive.

They soon encounter a red-colored 1967 Camaro loaded with four drunken thugs, led by Lep (Don Stroud) and get into a fit of road rage where Diane forces the punks off the road and into a creek bed, wrecking their car. At the lake house, Diane learns that despite what Harry had told her in order to get her to come with him, there are no other guests joining them at the house, and that he is only using her for sex.
Diane and Harry are unaware that the angry gang is seeking them, looking for some vicious revenge against the arguing, unhappy and unarmed couple. After the gang rampages through a camping park looking for the car that ran them off the road, they find the Corvette at a rural gas station where Harry had left it to be looked after while taking a less flashy station wagon to the country house. After intimidating the drunk station owners to give them the location to where Harry is staying, Lep and his friends drive off to their destination.

The four thugs break into the lake house and hold both Diane and Harry hostage. Over the rest of the day and night, Lep and his three cohorts Runt (Richard Ayres), Frankie (Kyle Edwards), and Stanley (Don Granberry), terrorize, harass, and humiliate their two captives from vandalizing the house to stealing Harry's speedboat and wrecking it, killing two townspeople in the process. When Diane attempts to escape, Lep recaptures her and, as punishment, rapes her.

At nightfall, the gang becomes more out of control with drinking and smoking dope. Harry confronts them with a pump-action shotgun, but he hesitates to shoot and Lep snatches the weapon from his hands. Lep then uses it to kill Harry as he attempts to flee from the house, and Diane is taken to a bedroom to be raped again, this time by Runt. Diane fights back and eventually kills Runt by slashing his neck with a shard of mirror glass and she manages to flee from the house. She later traps Frankie in the boathouse and sets it on fire, allowing him to burn to death. She then lures the pursuing Stanley to a nearby bog where he falls into a quicksand pit and drowns.

In the morning, Diane and the shotgun-toting Lep face off in a final confrontation in an open field where she attempts to hotwire and escape in Harry's car (with Harry's dead body in the front seat) as Lep tries to shoot her with the shotgun. When Lep runs out of ammunition, he climbs on top of the moving car to stop Diane attempting to drive away. The confrontation ends when Diane manages to shake Lep off the hood, and then runs him over, killing him.

Diane drives the bullet-ridden car away to a paved road where the car stalls on the side of the road. In the final shot, Diane, looking exhausted and dazed, exits the damaged car and looks down the empty road.

Cast

Filming locations

 King, Ontario
 Kleinburg, Ontario

US release
The film was released in the US by American International Pictures under the title House by the Lake. At the time of release, there was some controversy over the film's intense scenes of violence. Still, the film was released with only minor cuts to the original version.

Home video releases
Over the years, the film has gained some acclaim among horror film buffs and though it was released on VHS at one point by Vestron Video (under the title Death Weekend), the film has yet to receive a DVD release. On December 4, 2017, the movie was released uncut on DVD in Sweden by the distributor Studio S Entertainment.

Alternate versions
The US and English Canadian VHS releases are cut. Edited from the film was an additional shot of Lep on top of Diane as he attempts to rape her, a more graphic shot of Diane slashing Runt's throat, and a longer shot of Stanley burning to death.
 
However, both the French Canadian and Spanish VHS versions were released uncut.

See also

List of films featuring home invasions
Rape and revenge film

References

External links
 

1976 films
English-language Canadian films
1970s thriller films
1976 horror films
Canadian horror thriller films
Home invasions in film
Rape and revenge films
Films directed by William Fruet
Films produced by Ivan Reitman
Films set in Ontario
Films shot in Ontario
1970s English-language films
1970s Canadian films